Stony the Road: Reconstruction, White Supremacy, and the Rise of Jim Crow is a 2019 non-fiction book written by Henry Louis Gates Jr. covering African-American history during the Reconstruction era, Redemption era, and the New Negro Movement.

Publication
Stony the Road is a spiritual successor to Eric Foner's Reconstruction: America's Unfinished Revolution - 1863-1877. Its title is derived from a lyric in "Lift Every Voice and Sing." Gates was partially inspired to reexamine the Reconstruction era in response to modern white supremacist terror incidents in the United States like the Charleston church shooting, as well as to study historical precedents in growing African-American political power.

Contents 
Stony the Road offers a historical overview of the social advances of Reconstruction, the subsequent rollback of those policies with the resurgence of white supremacy during the Redemption period, and the attempts by African-Americans to change the cultural image of black people in the United States during the Harlem Renaissance, otherwise known as the New Negro Movement. Between chapters, there are illustrations and photographs to contrast the historically pervasive anti-black racist iconography with more affirming media from the New Negro Movement.

Reception
Stony the Road received positive reviews in The New York Times, NPR, The Nation, and The Washington Post.

References
 

Books about African-American history
2019 non-fiction books